In number theory, Waring's prime number conjecture is a conjecture related to Vinogradov's theorem, named after the English mathematician Edward Waring. It states that every odd number exceeding 3 is either a prime number or the sum of three prime numbers. It follows from the generalized Riemann hypothesis, and (trivially) from Goldbach's weak conjecture.

See also

 Schnirelmann's constant

References

External links
 

Additive number theory
Conjectures about prime numbers
Conjectures that have been proved